The Jardin d'Éguilles is a private contemporary garden in the town of Éguilles, in the French Department of Bouches-du-Rhône. It is classified by the French Ministry of Culture as one of the Remarkable Gardens of France. 

It was created in 1964 in an abandoned kitchen garden.  The garden is in a natural state, with a variety of exotic trees and fruit trees, works of sculpture and small basins with aquatic plants and fish.

See also
 Gardens of Provence-Alpes-Côte d'Azur

External links
 Site of the Committee of Parks and Gardens in France. (photos)

Provence
Eguilles, Jardin d'